The Best of The Waitresses may refer to:

The Best of The Waitresses (1990 album)
20th Century Masters – The Millennium Collection: The Best of The Waitresses